Arjun Singh (born 02 February 1963) is an Indian politician, who currently serves as Member of Legislative Assembly from Jawali constituency. Singh won first time from Jawali constituency in 2017 state assembly elections.

Early life and education
Arjun Singh was born on 2 February 1963 in Chalwara village of Jawali tehsil in Kangra district, Himachal Pradesh to Rattan Chand and Leela Devi.

Arjun Singh graduated from Wazir Ram Singh College Dehri, Kangra. He went on to complete an M. A. (History) from Himachal Pradesh University and a B. Ed. from MET college of Education, Sopore (in Jammu and Kashmir).

Politics
Singh's active state political journey started in 2012 and he associated with Himachal BJP organization. He was a member of block development committee from 1990 to 1995. Then he was a Zila Parishad from 1996 to 1998. He was elected as President for BJP organization in 2012 until 2018.

In 2017, he won from Jawali constituency as the Member of Legislative Assembly for Himachal Pradesh Legislative Assembly.

References

Bharatiya Janata Party politicians from Himachal Pradesh
1963 births
Living people
Himachal Pradesh MLAs 2017–2022
People from Kangra district